Tallimba is a town in the Central West area of New South Wales, Australia. It is a part of the Bland Shire 34 km from West Wyalong and 1½ hours' drive from Wagga Wagga.

Infrastructure
 St Bernadette's Catholic Church, built 1953, still in use each 1st and 3rd Sunday Mass 5pm
 Tallimba Hall
 Tallimba Inn
 Tallimba Public School
 Post Office (closed)
 Ruddy Shack
 Government Dam
 Tennis Courts
 Bank of New South Wales (closed)
 Hospital (closed)
 Tallimba War Memorial Park
 Cafe (closed)
 Golf club (closed)
 Cricket Oval
 Silos
 Tallimba Sales & Service
 Tallimba Police Station

Sporting teams 
 Tallimba Hawks - Australian Rules Football team (disbanded)
 Tallimba rugby league team (disbanded)
 Tallimba Cricket Club
 Tallimba Tennis Club

History of the primary school
Tallimba School was established to educate the children of settlers from the Tallimba District. Originally part of Willandry Station the arrival of the railway line from Barmedman meant wheat was able to be transported away to ports and mills.

There was an influx of settlers from Victoria and South Australia to take up bush blocks varying from 640 to 800 acres (2.6 to 3.2 km²). Despite the hardships endured in establishing a farm and home in virgin bush, the importance of education was not overlooked and on 16 June 1925, a school with 18 students opened.
Due to increasing enrolments a second teacher was appointed in 1949, and in 1950/51 the building was moved across the road to a new, less flood-prone site.

The school size peaked in 1968 with sufficient numbers for three teachers. The P&C have always actively supported the school providing for many facilities at the school before they became standard equipment.

Notable residents
 Terry Gathercole -  Olympic medallist in swimming and former Australian national team coach was born in Tallimba.
 Joy Hopper
 Fanny Lumsden - Country music singer

Gallery

References

External links 

Tallimba Railway Siding

Towns in New South Wales
Towns in the Central West (New South Wales)